Thompson Hall may refer to:
A building at Washington & Jefferson College
John F. Thompson Hall, a building at the University of Massachusetts Amherst
Thompson Hall (University of New Hampshire), listed on the National Register of Historic Places in Strafford County, New Hampshire